Stoulton railway station was a station to the northwest of Drakes Broughton, Worcestershire, England. The station was opened in 1899 and closed in 1966.

References

Further reading

Disused railway stations in Worcestershire
Railway stations in Great Britain opened in 1899
Railway stations in Great Britain closed in 1966
Former Great Western Railway stations
Beeching closures in England